The Strasburg Rail Road  is a heritage railroad and the oldest continuously operating standard-gauge railroad in the western hemisphere, as well as the oldest public utility in the Commonwealth of Pennsylvania. The railroad's headquarters are outside Strasburg, Pennsylvania.

Strasburg has a total of five operational steam locomotives on its roster, as well as several others in various stages of restoration. As of 2022, Canadian National No. 89, Great Western No. 90, Norfolk & Western No. 475 and Brooklyn Eastern District Terminal No. 15 (rebuilt as Thomas the Tank Engine) are all in active service. Canadian National No. 7312 (No. 31) is currently in storage awaiting to undergo its FRA inspection and overhaul. The other steam locomotive is 15” Gauge 4-4-0 built by Cagney in the early 1900s. They also have the nation's largest operating fleet of historic wooden passenger coaches. The Strasburg Rail Road is one of the few railroads in the U.S. to occasionally use steam locomotives to haul revenue freight trains. It hosts 300,000 visitors per year.

The nearby Railroad Museum of Pennsylvania occasionally uses Strasburg Rail Road tracks to connect to the Amtrak Philadelphia-to-Harrisburg Main Line junction in Paradise, Pennsylvania.

Description

Strasburg Rail Road is a shortline railroad that connects the town of Strasburg with Amtrak's Keystone Corridor mainline.

The railroad includes the United States' only operational wooden dining car on which visitors may dine while riding. Attractions at the station include the fully operational   gauge Pint-Sized Pufferbelly (Cagney steam-powered ridable miniature railway) a vintage pump car and several c.1930s "cranky cars", along with several gift shops and a cafe.

A percentage of each train ticket is contributed to the Lancaster Farmland Trust.

The railroad's mechanical and car shops maintain and restore locomotives and rolling stock for the Strasburg Rail Road and a wide variety of public and private clients, including fellow railroads, steam locomotive operators, train museums, and other heavy industries.

Its freight department provides shipping and transloading for local and regional clients. Since 2008, freight carloads have increased substantially, which resulted in development of a new $1.5 million transloading facility funded by the railroad and matching grants.

On February 12, 2023, the railroad opened up a six track freight yard that is located off of U.S. 30, Lincoln Highway.

History

By the 1820s, the canal system had replaced the Conestoga wagon as the primary method of overland transportation. When the Susquehanna Canal opened, the majority of goods were directed through Baltimore, Maryland, rather than Philadelphia. The small amount of goods that were destined for Philadelphia traveled via a wagon road through Strasburg. Philadelphia attempted to reclaim its position as a major port city by constructing the Philadelphia and Columbia Railroad in 1831. A railroad was easier and more cost effective to build than a canal. Because the new railroad would bypass Strasburg and cause Strasburg to lose its livelihood, a group of businessmen petitioned the state government for the right to build their own railroad to connect Strasburg to the Philadelphia and Columbia. A charter was issued by the Pennsylvania Legislature with the signature of Governor George Wolf on June 9, 1832 to "incorporate the Strasburg ".

Although the pre-1852 history of the Strasburg Rail Road is sketchy, it is believed that the line was graded in 1835 and was operational by 1837. The railroad operated as a horse-drawn railroad until it purchased a second-hand Norris-built, 4-2-0 steam locomotive named the William Penn in 1851. Controlling interest in the railroad was purchased by John F. and Cyrus N. Herr in 1863. The rails were replaced around the same time with heavier ones to accommodate the locomotive. In 1866, the Herrs were granted a charter to extend the Strasburg Rail Road to Quarryville; surveys were carried out, but the extension was eventually canceled because of an economic depression in 1867. Isaac Groff managed The Strasburg Rail Road for about 20 years until the fire of January 16, 1871, which destroyed the depot, grist, and merchant-mill, planing-mill and machine-shop — in all, more than $50,000 worth of property.  In 1878, the Strasburg Rail Road and the shops were sold.  The railroad was eventually again sold in 1888 to Edward Musselman, with the Musselman family retaining control of it until 1918 when it was purchased by State Senator John Homsher. By this time, the number of passengers had dropped off due to tracks for the Conestoga Traction Company's streetcars reaching Strasburg in 1908, which offered a more direct route between Lancaster and Strasburg.

By 1958, the railroad fell on hard-times from cumulative effect of years of declining freight business and infrequent runs, damage caused by Hurricane Hazel and inspectors from the Interstate Commerce Commission's lack of approval for operation of the Plymouth locomotive. Upon the death of Bryson Homsher, the Homsher estate filed for abandonment with the Pennsylvania Public Utility Commission. Hearing of the potential abandonment, an effort to purchase and save the railroad was organized by Henry K. Long and Donald E. L. Hallock, both railfans from Lancaster. They organized a small, non-profit group to purchase the railroad. After the better part of a year of hard work, the purchase was completed on November 1, 1958. The following week, on November 8, the first carload of revenue freight was hauled to what was then the only customer, a mill in Strasburg.

Tourist excursion service began on January 4, 1959, and their first steam locomotive arrived the following year in June 1960.

Equipment

Locomotives

No. 1 has operated on the Strasburg Rail Road ever since it was built in 1926. The engine is notable for being used to reconstruct the track and rails for the railroad between 1958 and 1959, after the railroad was purchased to become a tourist line.

No. 7312 originally operated for the Grand Trunk Railway and later the Canadian National Railway. It was the very first steam locomotive to be purchased by the Strasburg Rail Road in June 1959, it arrived on property in June 1960 and was placed into service on September 1, 1960, pulling the railroad's very first tourist train. It becoming the very first steam locomotive to return to service in the United States. It continued service until 2009, when it was taken out of service to undergo an extensive Federal Railroad Administration (FRA) 1,472 day inspection and overhaul. As of March 2023, it is currently undergoing restoration and overhaul to return to active service in the near future. 

No. 90 originally operated on Great Western Railway of Colorado to the company's towering mill in Loveland, Colorado where it hauled sugar beet trains. It was purchased by the Strasburg Rail Road on April 5, 1967 for a price of $23.000.00, it arrived on property a month later on May 5, 1967. The engine is occasionally repainted into different paint schemes for photo charters, such as the Great Western Railway (Colorado) scheme in a 2013 charter. In April 2023, No. 90 will be taken out of service to undergo its Federal Railroad Administration (FRA) 1,472 day inspection and overhaul.

No. 89 operated for the Green Mountain Railroad, in conjunction with Steamtown, U.S.A.. It was purchased by the Strasburg Rail Road in July 1972, and while en route to Strasburg in June of that year, it was in Penn Central's Buttonwood, Pennsylvania yard when Hurricane Agnes flooded the Susquehanna River. The floodwaters entered the locomotive's stack, delaying its debut at Strasburg. No. 89 arrived at the railroad facing East, and it remained in that status until the Railroad Museum of Pennsylvania's turntable was installed across the street in 1973.

No. 2 was acquired by the Strasburg Rail Road in 1984, it is occasionally used to move heavy equipment around the railyard. The engine would occasionally be re-themed to the Thomas character "Rusty" for the Day Out with Thomas events.

No. 475 originally operated for the Norfolk and Western Railway hauling freight, after retirement, it was sold to several different owners until being purchased by the Strasburg Rail Road in June 1991. It went through a two year restoration and was returned to operating condition in November 4, 1993. No. 475 would occasionally be refitted to resemble its sister locomotive No. 382 for Virginia Creeper photo charter events, hosted by Lerro Productions on separate occasions. Additionally, for the movie Thomas and the Magic Railroad, No. 475 and three passenger cars (only two of which wound up being used) were re-lettered "Indian Valley".

"Thomas" is actually Brooklyn Eastern District Terminal No. 15, originally built in March 1917 by the H.K. Porter Company. The engine was sold to the Strasburg Rail Road by Keith Brigode from the Toledo, Lake Erie and Western Railway in March 1998 and rebuilt to resemble the character, Thomas the Tank Engine for the Day Out With Thomas events. In April 2014, Thomas's face was replaced with the animatronic CGI face with the mouth's ability to open and close, and a voice speaker.

No. 3 is a  gauge miniature type steam locomotive that originally operated at Coney Island, it was acquired by the Strasburg Rail Road in 2003 and has remained in active service ever since.

No. 9 is another  gauge miniature type steam locomotive, it was acquired by the Strasburg Rail Road in 2012 to operate along with No. 3. Currently sitting in storage awaiting for restoration to operational condition.

No. 972 was acquired from Rail Tours Inc. of Jim Thorpe, Pennsylvania after the company could not afford the payments for mechanical repairs that Strasburg was performing on the locomotive at the time. It currently sits in storage until it can be repaired.

SRC also has a collection of early internal combustion locomotives; all but No. 1235 are in operation.

No. 10 original operated for the Lancaster, Oxford and Southern Railway until the line closed in 1918. In 1919, it was sold to the Grasse River Railroad in New York where it continued service there until 1960. That same year, it was later sold to Winston Gottschalk of the Strasburg Rail Road. In 1991, it entered the Strasburg shops for a complete restoration. After six years of restoration work, the railcar re-entered passenger service in 1997 and has continued operating since then.

No. 8618 originally operated for the New York Central Railroad, it was acquired by the Strasburg Rail Road in 2009. The engine is used for freight services only and would also haul excursions trains on occasion from time to time. The engine would also be occasionally re-themed into the Thomas character "Mavis" for the Day Out with Thomas events.

No. 1235 was brought to the railroad in late 2018. It arrived in poor condition, painted in faded Santa Fe dark blue, and is currently under going restoration to operation. No. 1235 is an ex-ATSF SSB-1200, rebuilt from a 1953 EMD SW9. In 1984, it was sold by GE to Celanese Corp.

While there are many locomotives which have gone through the backshop for restoration, some have been established to be in the shop only on hearsay. Only locomotives that have been publicly displayed or have been given a press release are counted as restorations and re-builds.

Former units

Both 1223 and 7002 were leased for operation. 1223 was leased from the PRR from 1965 to 1968, from Penn Central from 1968 to 1979 and from the Railroad Museum of Pennsylvania from 1979 to 1990. 7002 was also leased from the Railroad Museum of Pennsylvania. After ultra-sonic testing both engines were found to have thin spots in their fireboxes, which are a part of their boilers, thus the engines were taken out of service. The railroad stated they could have done the repairs but the lessor, the Railroad Museum of Pennsylvania, wanted to preserve the historical fabric of each locomotive and did not renew their leases the following year. 1223's last day of service for SRC was Thursday, October 26, 1989, while 7002's was earlier that year in January right after filming a Prudential Insurance commercial in Harrisburg Train Station. They have both remained on static display since being removed from service.

SRC 4 is a camelback-type locomotive originally built as Reading Railroad A4b 1187 by The Baldwin Locomotive Works. The locomotive has the distinction of being the only SRC locomotive to arrive under its own power, doing so in 1962 from E&G Brooke Iron Company of Birdsboro, PA. It had inadequate strength for SRC's heavy trains. As such, it ran as a switcher during the summer months from 1963 to 1967. After a loan to the Railroad Museum of Pennsylvania, it long sat dismantled pending long-term future restoration. It was acquired by the Age of Steam Roundhouse in Sugarcreek, Ohio during a July 15, 2020 auction and left the Strasburg yard on July 31, 2020.

Visiting units 
Locomotives that visited Strasburg either for events, to undergo a rebuild or, under a lease agreement.

Pre-1958
Strasburg rostered at least six steam locomotives prior to 1958. Evidence suggests that Strasburg only rostered one locomotive at a time, operating it until it was no longer economically viable to run it anymore and would purchase a new locomotive to replace it.

Passenger car roster

Accidents and incidents
On November 2, 2022, while running around a passenger train at Leaman Place, Paradise, No. 475 collided head-on with an excavator parked on a siding. The impact punched a hole in the smokebox door. No crew or passengers were injured, and the damage done was deemed relatively minor. The collision was broadcast live via Virtual Railfan and was caught on video via cellphone by one of the passengers on board the train that day. The accident was caused by a misaligned switch, and it is being investigated by the Federal Railroad Administration (FRA). Strasburg announced repairs on the locomotive had commenced immediately on November 3, the day after the accident. Repairs were completed  with the locomotive returning to service on November 7, 2022.

In film and television
The Strasburg Rail Road and its locomotives have appeared in a number of films and television series, including Thomas and the Magic Railroad and The Gilded Age.

References

Bibliography

External links

 
 
 
 HawkinsRails' Strasburg scrapbook

Heritage railroads in Pennsylvania
Pennsylvania railroads
Railroad museums in Pennsylvania
Railway companies established in 1832
Switching and terminal railroads
Tourist attractions in Lancaster County, Pennsylvania
Horse-drawn railways
1832 establishments in Pennsylvania
American companies established in 1832